In  the mathematical field of geometric topology, among the techniques known as surgery theory, the process of plumbing is a way to create new manifolds out of disk bundles. It was first described by John Milnor and subsequently used extensively in surgery theory to produce manifolds and normal maps with given surgery obstructions.

Definition 

Let  be a rank n vector bundle over an n-dimensional smooth manifold  for i = 1,2. Denote by  the total space of the associated (closed) disk bundle and suppose that  and are oriented in a compatible way. Let  and  be two diffeomorphisms (either both orientation preserving or reversing).
The smooth structure on the quotient is  defined by "straightening the angles".

Plumbing according to a tree 
If the base manifold is an n-sphere , then by iterating this procedure over several vector bundles over  one can plumb them together according to a tree§8. One has to be careful that neighbourhoods in the total spaces do not overlap.

Milnor manifolds 
Let  denote the disk bundle associated to the tangent bundle of the 2k-sphere. If we plumb eight copies of  according to the diagram , we obtain a 4k-dimensional manifold which certain authors call the Milnor manifold   (see also E8 manifold). 

For , the boundary  is a homotopy sphere which generates , the group of h-cobordism classes of homotopy spheres which bound  π-manifolds (see also exotic spheres for more details).

The plumbing theorem 

A crucial theorem for the development of surgery theory is the so-called Plumbing Theorem II.1.3 (presented here in the simply connected case):

The proof of this theorem makes use of the Milnor manifolds defined above.

References 

 
 
 
 
 

Differential topology
Surgery theory
Fiber bundles
Vector bundles
Manifolds